Alois Terry Leiter (born October 23, 1965) is an American former professional baseball player and current television sports commentator.

A two-time National League (NL) All-Star player, Leiter pitched for three World Series winning teams and threw a no-hitter in 1996 during his tenure with the Marlins. In 2000, Leiter was named the recipient of the prestigious Roberto Clemente Award. After his playing career, he worked as a  television  color commentator and baseball analyst for the YES Network and the MLB Network.

Career

Early career
Leiter was raised in a baseball-oriented family; all five of his brothers played the game. A native of Berkeley Township, New Jersey, Leiter attended Central Regional High School, in the township's Bayville section.  During one stretch in high school, he pitched consecutive no-hitters followed by a 32-strikeout game in 13 innings on April 19, 1984 (a game which ended in a tie when it was called for rain). Leiter was selected for the Wilson First Team All-American team. In 2016, the NJSIAA named Leiter to the NJ High School Hall of Fame.

New York Yankees
Leiter was drafted by New York Yankees in 1984 MLB draft as a second round pick. Both he and his brother Mark became Yankees prospects.

Leiter made his MLB debut as the starting pitcher for the Yankees on September 15, 1987, earning the win in a Yankees 4–3 victory over the Milwaukee Brewers at Yankee Stadium. Leiter has mentioned on a YES Network broadcast that early in his career with the Yankees, manager Billy Martin walked up to him and asked him why he was lifting weights. Leiter responded, "To strengthen my arm." Billy was quoted as saying, "If you want to strengthen your arm, do some long toss." The young Leiter grew nervous easily; teammate Tommy John observed "If they had named him to start on opening day [in 1989], he wouldn't have slept for a week. That's how high-strung he was. He was a rookie bouncing off the walls." In one of his final starts as a young player for the Yankees, manager Dallas Green left Leiter in to throw 162 pitches on a cold damp day in 1989.

Toronto Blue Jays
The Yankees traded him to the Toronto Blue Jays for outfielder Jesse Barfield on April 30, 1989. After being dealt to Toronto, the left-hander had arthroscopic surgery. He pitched in fewer than 20 innings for the Blue Jays from 1989 to 1992, because of the surgery, a pinched nerve in his elbow, tendinitis, and another arthroscopic surgery on his left shoulder.  His statistics during this period were a 5.17 ERA,  IP, 14 H, 10 K, 11 BB, 1 HR, 1 GS, 0–0. He was, however, able to overcome a blisters problem with an exotic liniment (that he used throughout his career), and was still seen as a very promising prospect.

Leiter finally got over his injury troubles in 1993, making 32 appearances (12 starts) for the Blue Jays. That year he appeared in 5 postseason games and even picked up a win in relief in Game One, and hit a double in Game Three of the 1993 World Series, as the Blue Jays went on to win their second consecutive World Championship. Leiter pitched effectively for the Blue Jays for the next two seasons before departing via free agency in 1996.

Florida Marlins
Following the 1995 season, Leiter left Toronto and signed with the Florida Marlins as a free agent. In his first season as a Marlin, Leiter made his first All-Star team, going 16–12 with a 2.93 ERA and 200 strikeouts.

On May 11, 1996, he pitched a no-hitter against the Colorado Rockies, the first no-hitter in Marlins franchise history.  This was also the first no-hitter that included a three-pitch inning. Leiter was also selected to his first All Star game. The game was played at Veterans Stadium in Philadelphia where he recorded the last out of a National League 6–0 win over the American League. The win was the last NL win for 13 years until 2010 when the National League won the All Star Classic in Anaheim.

In 1997, Leiter won another World Series as the Marlins beat the Cleveland Indians. Leiter started Game 7 for the Marlins, pitching 6 innings and giving up two earned runs while being credited with a no decision. The Marlins would go on to win the game 3–2 in 11 innings to capture the championship.

New York Mets

In the following off-season, Leiter was traded to the New York Mets in part of the Marlins' fire sale where owner Wayne Huizenga traded away almost all of the team's higher priced players.

In Leiter's first season as a Met, he reached a career high in wins going 17–6 and a career low in ERA finishing with a 2.47 ERA. In 1999, when the Mets were tied with the Cincinnati Reds for the National League Wild Card spot after 162 games, Leiter was the Mets starting pitcher in the "winner take all" one game playoff at Cinergy Field in Cincinnati. Leiter pitched a 2-hit shutout to earn the win in the Mets 5–0 victory. The win put the Mets in the playoffs for the first time in 11 seasons. The Mets would go on to lose the 1999 National League Championship Series to the Atlanta Braves 4 games to 2.

In 2000, Leiter made the All-Star team once again going 16–8 with a 3.20 ERA and 200 strikeouts. The Mets made the playoffs again in 2000 and this time reached the World Series.  Leiter started Game 1 of the 2000 World Series at Yankee Stadium and Game 5 at Shea Stadium. Although he managed to achieve a 2.87 ERA and 16 strikeouts in  innings, the Mets lost both games he started and eventually lost the World Series 4 games to 1.  He was booed by Yankee fans when presented that year's Roberto Clemente Award prior to Game 2 of the World Series.  Leiter was the second New York Met to be honored with the award.  During the 2000 season, he pitched in the All Star game, and gave up a single to Derek Jeter.

On April 30, 2002, Leiter became the first Major League pitcher to defeat all 30 teams, after beating the Arizona Diamondbacks 10–1.  Leiter would pitch for the Mets until the end of the 2004 season. In his seven seasons in a Met uniform, all wearing number 22, he went 95–67 with a 3.42 ERA. At the time he left the Mets, he ranked highly on several Mets all-time lists including wins (6th), strikeouts (7th with 1106), innings pitched (7th with 1360.0), and games started (6th with 213). He was the Mets Opening Day starting pitcher in 1999, 2001, and 2002.

In ten straight seasons, from 1995 to 2004, Leiter had at least 10 wins and at least a .500 record.

Second stint with Marlins
Following the 2004 season, the Mets declined Leiter's US$10 million option for 2005, making him a free agent. His former team, the Marlins, signed Leiter to a one-year, $8 million contract on December 8, 2004.

Leiter struggled during his return to the Marlins. He walked more batters than usual (60 in 80 innings, in addition to 88 hits). In 17 appearances (16 starts), he had a 3–7 record and a 6.64 ERA, and he took much criticism for the Marlins' first-half struggles in 2005 (they were 7 games behind the surprising Washington Nationals at the All-Star break).  He was demoted to the bullpen in late June, but he returned to the rotation after an injury to Josh Beckett. On July 10, when the Marlins played their last game before the three-day All-Star break, he gave up six runs in three-plus innings.

On July 14, 2005, the Florida Marlins designated Leiter for assignment.

Second stint with Yankees
On July 15, 2005, Leiter was acquired by the New York Yankees, who had four starting pitchers on the disabled list, for a player to be named later. His first start as a Yankee since April 26, 1989, came on July 17, 2005, against the division-leading Boston Red Sox. Leiter won the game, pitching  innings, allowing one run and three hits, and striking out eight. After several starts with mixed success, he informed Joe Torre that he would be willing to pitch out of the bullpen, where he would stay for the latter part of the season, yielding his starting slot to Aaron Small.

Leiter worked out of the bullpen in the 2005 American League Division Series pitching in four of the five games between the Yankees and Los Angeles Angels of Anaheim. The Angels won the series 3 games to 2. In his final official appearance in a Major League uniform, Leiter earned a win, pitching  scoreless innings in Game 4 at Yankee Stadium. The Yankees won the game 3–2.

Leiter signed a minor league contract with the Yankees in 2006; however, he stated he would likely retire. The primary reason he spent part of spring training with the Yankees was to keep in shape for the World Baseball Classic. After the United States team was eliminated from the World Baseball Classic, he officially retired in an interview on YES, after a Yankees spring training victory versus the Indians where Leiter pitched  of an inning.

Broadcasting career
Al Leiter has worked in the television broadcast booth for Fox during the playoffs for several seasons, mainly to provide in-depth analysis of various pitchers. Worked the post season for ESPN as studio analyst in 1998 and 1999. While still playing for the NY Mets, his first opportunity as a color commentator for Fox Sports was in 2003 NLCS. The Marlins went on to win the World Series that year beating the Yankees. Leiter worked as an analyst alongside Thom Brennaman and Steve Lyons. The following year, Leiter was in the booth with Joe Buck and Tim McCarver for the Boston Red Sox Vs. NY Yankees in the ALCS. Since 2006, Leiter has worked as a color commentator and a studio analyst for the YES Network. He won a NY Emmy in 2007 for the "Manny game" in Boston. In 2009, Leiter was hired by MLB Network and appeared on the very first show the Network produced on January 1, 2009. He became a studio analyst for MLB Network in addition to his commentating job for the YES Network. In 2009, 2011, 2013, 2015, 2018, and 2019 he received a National Sports Emmy Award Nomination for Studio Analyst. In 2012, 2014, 2016, and 2019 he received the Sports Emmy for Outstanding Studio Show-Daily MLB Tonight Segment Producer. He also worked select games for the Miami Marlins on Fox Sports Florida in 2016. In 2016, he won the NY Sports Emmy for game analyst for the YES Network.
 On March 3, 2019, he was named a baseball operations advisor for the Mets. Leiter will focus on scouting and player development with an emphasis on mental preparation for pitchers, working with players at every level of the organization, from newly drafted players to Major Leaguers.

Charitable work
Leiter has won nearly every philanthropic award MLB offers, including the 2000 Roberto Clemente Award. He also won the Branch Rickey Award in 1999.

Political activities 
Leiter has expressed interest in running for political office as a Republican in his home state of New Jersey. He served as a member of New Jersey Governor Chris Christie's transition team. Leiter was appointed as a member to the New Jersey Sports, Gaming, and Entertainment Committee. Governor Christie nominated him for the New Jersey Hall of Fame Commission and he was appointed to the commission by the state senate.

Leiter has donated thousands of dollars to GOP candidates, including Donald Trump, David Perdue, Kelly Loeffler, Lindsey Graham, Chris Christie, and Rudy Giuliani.

Personal life 
Leiter is of Austrian, Czech and British descent. He and his wife Lori have four children: Lindsay Brooke, Carly Jayne, Jack Thomas, and Katelyn Grace. His brother Mark Leiter pitched 11 seasons in the Majors. Another brother, Kurt, played in the Baltimore Orioles organization and reached as high as Double-A. His nephew Mark Leiter Jr. is also a professional baseball pitcher.

See also
 List of Major League Baseball career hit batsmen leaders
 List of Major League Baseball career strikeout leaders
 List of Major League Baseball no-hitters

References

External links

Al Leiter Biography Baseball Biography
Leiter's Landing- Al Leiter's Charity 

1965 births
Living people
Albany-Colonie Yankees players
American expatriate baseball players in Canada
American people of Austrian descent
American people of British descent
American people of Czech descent
Baseball players from New Jersey
Central Regional High School alumni
Columbus Clippers players
Dunedin Blue Jays players
Florida Marlins players
Fort Lauderdale Yankees players
Major League Baseball pitchers
Miami Marlins announcers
MLB Network personalities
National League All-Stars
New Jersey Hall of Fame inductees
New Jersey Republicans
New York Mets players
New York Yankees announcers
New York Yankees players
Oneonta Yankees players
People from Berkeley Township, New Jersey
Sportspeople from Ocean County, New Jersey
Sportspeople from Manhattan
Baseball players from New York City
Sportspeople from Toms River, New Jersey
Syracuse Chiefs players
Toronto Blue Jays players
World Baseball Classic players of the United States
YES Network
2006 World Baseball Classic players